Rhodella is a genus of red algae.

It includes the species Rhodella reticulata, as well as Rhodella violacea

References

Red algae genera